"Can't Stop" is a song by American rock band Red Hot Chili Peppers from their eighth studio album, By the Way (2002). It was released as the third single from the album on February 3, 2002. The song was the band's eighth number one on the US Billboard Modern Rock Tracks chart, where it spent three weeks topping the chart, and peaked at number 57 on the Billboard Hot 100. "Can't Stop" performed moderately well on international charts as well as on the Billboard Modern Rock Tracks and Mainstream Rock charts.

Composition and lyrical denotation 
The song is instrumentally composed in 4/4 standard time and in the key of E minor. The verse plays twice before the bridge, as well as the chorus. During the bridge, Frusciante plays sparsely in a reggae style, only strumming on the up-beat. Following the bridge, Frusciante utilizes a fuzz (Big Muff Pi by Electro Harmonix) in his solo. He also makes extensive use of a tone-bend.

Lyrically, "Can't Stop" is a prime example of the band's occasional use of writing lyrics to an established rhythm, rather than rhythms to established lyrics. Kiedis writes in his typical circumlocutory style. Nonetheless, the predominant theme of cultivating an inner, personal energy (evidenced in the title and the final line: "This life is more than just a read-through.") can be understood in almost every line. The verses are addressed to the listener (or perhaps to himself), in an instructional tone, with references to Kiedis's own life, as well as citing the inspiration of Defunkt ("Defunkt, the pistol that you pay for") and Julia Butterfly Hill ("J. Butterfly is in the treetops"). The bridge marks a slight departure, as Kiedis suggests he had temporarily forgotten this philosophy, and looks to a new girlfriend to help himself back on his feet.

Reception and chart performance 
The song itself is distinct, especially when in comparison to the various other tracks on By the Way. Some consider the song to be among the only true punk/funk sounds on the entire album, along with "Throw Away Your Television". "Can't Stop" was considered to be "energetic" and melodically encompassing, by combining textured, melodic, and funky themes together into one.

The song was the Chili Peppers' eighth number one on the Modern Rock Tracks chart, and second from the album By the Way. It also peaked at number 57 on the Billboard Hot 100. Regardless of the moderate recognition it received on the Billboard Hot 100, the song is a live performance staple.

Music video 
The Mark Romanek-directed music video for the single, released on January 24, 2003, features all four of the band members doing seemingly random and excessively abstract actions such as holding many water bottles or attempting to balance buckets on their heads. It begins with the camera swooping through a yellow tube to Anthony Kiedis, wearing glasses, and is subsequently followed by the foursome running through a hall with light fixtures attached to their backs. The band engages in various activities, such as wearing a giant purple hippopotamus mask, playing with rubber balls, jumping, abstract scenes with boxes, buckets, water bottles, trash cans, flying through the air, pink foam peanuts, plants, playing guitar in a room full of empty blue chairs/room with lamps turning on and off.

At certain segments of the video, one can see guitarist John Frusciante playing an orange Toronado and a silver Fender Stratocaster, which is unlike his style due to the fact that he only plays vintage guitars (both guitars being under five years of age). Frusciante later explained he was instructed to play the guitars by director Mark Romanek since they blended well with the color scheme used in the video; he also noted that he was never actually playing the guitars.

Inspiration for the video was attributed to Austrian artist Erwin Wurm, as indicated by the sign at the end of the video. The lighting was positioned in order to provide a clean-cut, contemporary atmosphere which would integrate with the video's concept. Orange was chosen to be the backsplash color by Romanek. His creative hand attempted to mirror Wurm's abstract "One Minute Sculptures", by having the band perform random scenes, which seem to fit no purpose. However, in retrospect, they were not intended to be anything more than an homage.

Track listings 
CD single 1
 "Can't Stop" (John Frusciante single mix) – 4:29
 "If You Have to Ask" (live)
 "Christchurch Fireworks Music" (live) – 5:42

CD single 2
 "Can't Stop" (John Frusciante single mix) – 4:29
 "Right on Time" (live)
 "Nothing to Lose" (live) – 12:58

CD single 3 and 7-inch single
 "Can't Stop" (John Frusciante single mix) – 4:29
 "Christchurch Fireworks Music" (live) – 5:42

Personnel 
Red Hot Chili Peppers
 Anthony Kiedis – lead vocals
 John Frusciante – guitar, handclaps, backing vocals
 Flea – bass, backing vocals in live performances
 Chad Smith – drums, handclaps

Charts

Certifications

Release history

References 

Red Hot Chili Peppers songs
2002 songs
2003 singles
Music videos directed by Mark Romanek
Song recordings produced by Rick Rubin
Songs written by Anthony Kiedis
Songs written by Chad Smith
Songs written by Flea (musician)
Songs written by John Frusciante